(I am content in myself), BWV 204, is a secular cantata composed by Johann Sebastian Bach in Leipzig between 1726 and 1727.

History and text 
Bach composed this cantata in Leipzig between 1726 and 1727 for an unknown occasion. The text is drawn from the work of Christian Friedrich Hunold. Hunold and Bach are assumed to have met, but the librettist died in 1721, which is well before the cantata appears to have been composed.

The music of the closing aria was reused in the wedding cantata Vergnügte PleißenStadt, BWV 216 of 1728.

Scoring and structure 
The cantata is scored for soprano soloist, flauto traverso, two oboes, two violins, viola, and basso continuo.

It has eight movements:
Recitative: 
Aria: 
Recitative: 
Aria: 
Recitative: 
Aria: 
Recitative: 
Aria:

Music 
The opening recitative is harmonically active but melodically fragmented because of the unusual choice to set balanced couplets in recitative. The first aria is characterized by a "restless feeling of effort" beginning immediately after the short instrumental ritornello, and is the only one in da capo form. The second recitative is the only one to be accompagnato, with the strings supporting a harmony that "begins to slide around like quicksand". The second aria has a flowing ritornello theme provided by continuo and obbligato violin. The third recitative is secco with "two bursts of operatic virtuosity". The third aria is in ternary form and minor mode. The fourth recitative includes an arioso passage ending on an "exceedingly odd" cadence. The final movement is the only one to include all instrumental parts, with a dance-like opening theme and an ABAB structure.

Recordings 
Amsterdam Baroque Orchestra, Ton Koopman. J.S. Bach: Complete Cantatas  Vol. 4. Erato, 1996.
Bach-Collegium Stuttgart, Helmuth Rilling. Edition Bachakademie Vol. 62. Hänssler, 1998.
Württemberg Chamber Orchestra, Rudolf Ewerhart. Bach Cantatas. Vox, 1966.
Bach Collegium Japan, Masaaki Suzuki. J. S. Bach: Secular Cantatas, Vol. 10. BIS, 2018.

Notes

References

External links 
 
 BWV 204 – "Ich bin in mir vergnügt": English translation, Emmanuel Music
 Ich bin in mir vergnügt: history, scoring, Bach website 
 BWV 204 Ich bin in mir vergnügt: English translation, University of Vermont

Secular cantatas by Johann Sebastian Bach
1726 compositions
1727 compositions